"Hunters of the Night" is a song by the band Mr. Mister, released as the first single from their 1984 debut album, I Wear the Face.

Background and music
The power ballad was written by bassist Richard Page and keyboardist Steve George. It was co-written with lyricist John Lang and George Ghiz, who was the band's manager at the time. The single was released in 1984 along with a music video. The early exposure lead to a chart peak of number 57 on the Billboard Hot 100 and buoyed the success of their follow-up album, Welcome to the Real World.

Track listing
7" single
"Hunters of the Night" (radio edit) - 4:08
"I Get Lost Sometimes" - 3:50

Charts

References

1984 singles
Mr. Mister songs
Songs written by Steve George (keyboardist)
Songs written by Richard Page (musician)
1984 songs
RCA Records singles
1980s ballads
Pop ballads
Rock ballads